The College of Arts and Sciences (CAS) is one of the eleven degree-granting units of the University of the Philippines Los Baños. It is the largest college in University of the Philippines System which offers most of the general education subjects required of UPLB students, as well as the highest number of degree programs in the University. The Philippines' Commission on Higher Education has recognized CAS as a Center of Excellence in Biology, Chemistry, Information Technology and Mathematics, as well as a Center of Development in Physics and Statistics.

History

The Board of Regents of the University of the Philippines at its 828th meeting on 21 December 1972 adopted Presidential Decree No. 58 issued on November 20, 1972 establishing the College of Science and Humanities. The Board appointed Edelwina C. Legaspi as the first dean of the new college, and a month later, Dolores A. Ramirez as secretary.

The College's first seven departments were Humanities, Chemistry, Mathematics, Statistics and Physics, Botany, Zoology, Life Sciences and Social Sciences.

The college was renamed College of Arts and Sciences on October 28, 1977.

On 23 March 1983, CAS reorganized its science and mathematics departments into three institutes: Institute of Mathematical Sciences and Physics from the former Department of Mathematics and Physics, Department of Statistics and Statistical Laboratory and the Computer Science unit; Institute of Chemistry from the former Department of Chemistry and; Institute of Biological Sciences from the former Botany, Life Sciences and Zoology departments. Together with three similar institutes in UP Diliman, they were designed to form part of a system of national centers of excellence in basic sciences.

The Division of Computer Science, because of the fast development in the field and rapid growth of student population, became an Institute in January 1996.

The Physical Education Department was placed under the CAS and started offering a Diploma in Physical Education. It was eventually renamed Department of Human Kinetics.
The Division of Statistics was transformed into an Institute in January 1998.

Institutes/Departments
 Institute of Biological Sciences (IBS) - Established on March 23, 1983, it offers a Bachelor of Science degree in Biology with specializations in cell and molecular biology, ecology, genetics, microbiology, plant biology, systematics, wildlife biology, and zoology. It also offers 12 graduate degrees: six master's degree, three doctor of philosophy, and three doctor of philosophy by research. Students are admitted to the institute through the University of the Philippines College Admission Test. The institute is composed of five divisions namely on animal biology, environmental biology, genetics and molecular biology, microbiology, and plant biology. In 2014, the undergraduate degree program in Biology of the institute received its certification and accreditation under the ASEAN University Network-Quality Assurance System. Researchers from the institute discovered new species of spiders from Mount Makiling. Other facilities that support the institute are the Limnological Station, UPLB Museum of National History, University of the Philippines Open University, National Institute of Molecular Biology and Biotechnology, National Crop Protection Center, Institute of Plant Breeding, and International Rice Research Institute.
 Institute of Chemistry (IC)
 Institute of Computer Science (ICS)
 Institute of Mathematical Sciences and Physics (IMSP)
 Institute of Statistics (IS)
 Department of Humanities (DH)
 Department of Social Sciences (DSS)
 Department of Human Kinetics (DHK)
 UP Rural High School (UPRHS)

Undergraduate Degree Programs
 BA Communication ArtsMajors: Speech, Theater, Writing
 BA Philosophy
 BA Sociology
 BS Applied MathematicsMajors  : Actuarial Science, Operations Research, Biomathematics
 BS Applied PhysicsSpecializations: Computational Physics, Experimental Physics, Instrumentation Physics
 BS BiologyMajors: Cell and Molecular Biology, Ecology, Genetics, Microbiology, Plant Biology, Systematics, Wildlife Biology and Zoology
 BS Chemistry
 BS Computer Science

 BS Mathematics
 BS Mathematics and Science TeachingMajors : Physics, Chemistry, Biology, Mathematics
 BS Statistics

References

External links
 College of Arts and Sciences website
 University of the Philippines Los Baños

Arts and Sciences
Educational institutions established in 1972